Events in the year 1326 in Norway.

Incumbents
Monarch: Magnus VII Eriksson

Events
3 June – The Treaty of Novgorod marked an end of long-lasting border skirmishes in the region of Finnmark, between Norway and the Republic of Novgorod.

References

Norway